"Oh Uganda, Land of Beauty" is the national anthem of Uganda. George Wilberforce Kakoma composed the music and authored the lyrics. It was adopted as the national anthem in 1962, when the country gained independence from the United Kingdom. It is musically one of the shortest national anthems in the world. Consequently, multiple verses are sung when it is performed in public.

History
From 1894 until the height of decolonisation during the 1960s, Uganda was a protectorate of the United Kingdom within its colonial empire. In the run up to independence, a subcommittee was formed to determine an anthem for the forthcoming state. It proceeded to hold a nationwide contest, with the criteria they stipulated for the anthem being that it should be "short, original, solemn, praising and looking forward to the future".

In the end, the lyrics and tune composed by George Wilberforce Kakoma were selected in July 1962. He wrote the anthem in one day, having listened on Radio Uganda the night before about how none of the entries received so far had been deemed suitable by the subcommittee. His entry was one of four that was shortlisted. The song was officially adopted in 1962, the year the country gained independence. The first public occasion where the anthem was played was at the celebrations marking independence on 9 October 1962.

Kakoma subsequently sued the government in 2008, claiming that he was never adequately remunerated and thus had rights to over four decades of royalty payments. He alleged that the government gave him a mere USh.2,000/=, equivalent to less than £1 in 2008, as a "token of thanks". Kakoma died before the country's Court of Appeal dismissed the case in 2019, finding that the anthem's copyright vested in the government and not the author.

Lyrics

In national languages

In local languages

Along with the Luganda and Swahili translations, the national anthem has also been translated into several other local languages.

Composition
At only eight bars long, "Oh Uganda, Land of Beauty" is musically one of the shortest national anthems in the world, together with Japan's anthem.  Both Michael Bristow, the editor of the book National Anthems of the World, and Philip Sheppard have identified Uganda's national anthem as the shortest.  As a result, multiple verses are typically sung when it is performed at public events like international football games.

Notes

References

External links
Uganda: Oh Uganda, Land of Beauty - Audio of the national anthem of Uganda, with information and lyrics (archive link)
Pearl of Africa MIDI

Ugandan music
National symbols of Uganda
African anthems
National anthem compositions in F-sharp major
National anthem compositions in G major
Songs involved in royalties controversies
1962 songs